The Appalachian Wireless Arena is a multi-purpose arena in Pikeville, Kentucky. Opened in October 2005, it hosts various local concerts and sporting events for the area. The facility, which can seat 7,000 for concerts and 5,700 for sporting events, is owned by the Commonwealth of Kentucky and managed by the City of Pikeville.

History 
From 2005 to 2019, the facility was named the Eastern Kentucky Expo Center, however in June 2019 naming rights were sold to Appalachian Wireless, as part of a 5-year, $85,000/year contract.

On October 22, 2022, the Kentucky Wildcats men's basketball played the annual Blue-White intra-squad scrimmage, normally held at Rupp Arena at Appalachian Wireless Arena to raise money for relief due to the 2022 Eastern Kentucky floods.  The event raised over $160,000.

About

7,000-seat arena
26,000 sq. feet facility— 24,000 sq. foot arena floor
5,000 sq. feet of meeting room/ballroom space with sub divisible wall
Boardroom space for smaller meetings
3 Levels: event level, main concourse, upper level
5 concession stands around the main concourse level
Full Service Food & Beverage Department by Elite Catering

Tenants

References

External links 
 
Facebook page
Twitter page

Pikeville Bears basketball
Indoor arenas in Kentucky
Buildings and structures in Pike County, Kentucky
Sports venues in Kentucky
Basketball venues in Kentucky
Sports venues completed in 2005
American Basketball Association (2000–present) venues
Convention centers in Kentucky
Continental Basketball Association venues
2005 establishments in Kentucky
Pikeville, Kentucky